At the end of each Africa Cup of Nations final tournament, several awards are presented to the players and teams which have distinguished themselves in various aspects of the match.

Awards
There are currently six post-tournament awards
 the Best Player for most valuable player;
 the Top Goalscorer for most prolific goal scorer;
 the Best Goalkeeper  for most outstanding goalkeeper;
 the Best Young Player  for most outstanding young player;
 the Team of the Tournament for best combined team of players at the tournament;
 the Fair Play Award for the team with the best record of fair play.

Best Player

Top Goalscorer

Best Goalkeeper

Best Young Player

Team of the Tournament

Fair Play Award

See also 
 FIFA World Cup awards
 UEFA European Championship awards
 Copa América awards
 AFC Asian Cup awards
 CONCACAF Gold Cup awards
 OFC Nations Cup awards

References

Africa Cup of Nations